The Democratic Party of Vietnam was a political party in the Democratic Republic of Vietnam (later only North Vietnam). It was founded on 30 July 1944 to unite petite bourgeoisie and intelligentsia in support of the Vietminh and in effect its satellite party. It was a member of the Vietnamese Fatherland Front and was represented in the Vietnamese parliament and government, its leader were Dương Đức Hiền and Nghiêm Xuân Yêm. The party (along with the other 'non-communist' party in Vietnam, the Socialist Party) was disbanded in 1988.

In 2006, a dissident organization with the same name was established. Hoàng Minh Chính, a member of the former Democratic Party, was involved in its founding.

History
This party was established in 1944, when Vietnam was still occupied by France. In 1945, it gained independence as Democratic Republic of Vietnam. It was a member of Vietnamese Fatherland Front and fought against France in a war for independence. During 1955–1988, it was one of only three parties that were allowed to operate in North Vietnam and then the Socialist Republic of Vietnam. It dissolved in 1988.

Ideologies
Its ideologies included social democracy, socialism and Marxism–Leninism. Nationalism was also one of DPV's ideologies. Its position ranges from centre-left to left-wing.

References

Länder der Erde. Politisch-ökonomisches Handbuch. Berlin [Ost], 1971.

1940s in French Indochina
1944 establishments in French Indochina
1944 establishments in Vietnam
1950s in French Indochina
1988 disestablishments in Vietnam
Defunct political parties in Vietnam
Political parties disestablished in 1988
Political parties established in 1944
Socialist parties in Vietnam